

Places 
Hardenberg
 Hardenberg is a municipality and city in Overijssel, Netherlands
 Nörten-Hardenberg, a municipality in Lower Saxony, Germany
 Hardenberg Castle, ruin at Nörten-Hardenberg, ancestral seat of the lower-saxonian House of Hardenberg 
 Schloss Hardenberg, castle once owned by the westphalian House of Hardenberg in the German town of Velbert
 Neuhardenberg, community in Brandenburg, Germany. Formerly residence of the Prussian statesman Prince Karl August von Hardenberg

Hardenburg
 Hardenburg, California, United States

Hardenburgh
 Hardenburgh, New York
 Hardenbergh Hall, Rutgers University
 Hardenburgh Avenue Bridge, Demarest, New Jersey
 Hardenburgh, Indiana (now known as Hayden)

People 
 Hardenberg (surname)

See also 
 Hardenberger
 Hardenbergh
 von Hardenberg